Sunderland North was a borough constituency represented in the House of Commons of the Parliament of the United Kingdom from 1950 to 2010. It elected one Member of Parliament (MP) by the first past the post system of election.

History
Sunderland North, as can be inferred from the name, formed the northern part of the County Borough (now City) of Sunderland. The constituency was created by the Representation of the People Act 1948 for the 1950 general election when the existing two-member Sunderland seat was split in two. Fulwell was transferred from Houghton-le-Spring.

It was abolished for the 2010 general election when it was replaced by the new constituency of Sunderland Central, with the exception of the two western wards of Castle and Redhill, which were transferred to the new constituency of Washington and Sunderland West.

It was considered to be a safe seat for the Labour Party throughout its existence.

Boundaries

1950–1974 

 The County Borough of Sunderland wards of Bridge, Central, Colliery, Deptford, Fulwell, Monkwearmouth, Monkwearmouth Shore, Roker, and Southwick.

1974–1983 

 The County Borough of Sunderland wards of Castletown, Central, Colliery, Deptford, Downhill, Ford, Fulwell, Hylton Castle, Monkwearmouth, Pallion, Roker, and Southwick.

Boundaries expanded in line with those of the County Borough, including the gain of Hylton from Houghton-le-Spring.  Existing boundary with Sunderland South realigned, including the gain of Pallion ward.

1983–1997 

 The Metropolitan Borough of Sunderland wards of Castletown, Central, Colliery, Fulwell, Pallion, St Peter's, South Hylton, Southwick, and Town End Farm.

Minor changes to take account of new ward boundaries.

1997–2010 

 The City of Sunderland wards of Castletown, Central, Colliery, Fulwell, Pallion, St Peter's, Southwick, and Town End Farm.

South Hylton ward transferred to Sunderland South.

Members of Parliament

Elections

Elections in the 1950s

Elections in the 1960s

Elections in the 1970s

Elections in the 1980s

Elections in the 1990s

Elections in the 2000s

See also
 History of parliamentary constituencies and boundaries in Tyne and Wear
 History of parliamentary constituencies and boundaries in Durham

Notes and references

Politics of the City of Sunderland
Parliamentary constituencies in Tyne and Wear (historic)
Constituencies of the Parliament of the United Kingdom established in 1950
Constituencies of the Parliament of the United Kingdom disestablished in 2010
Sunderland